Polychrus acutirostris, the Brazilian bush anole, is a species of lizard native to southern and eastern Brazil, Paraguay, Argentina, and eastern Bolivia. It is diurnal.

Description
Polychrus acutirostris is a medium-sized lizard. One of the lizard's predators is the curl-crested jay. The lizard is omnivorous, known for eating both insects and plants. Research have also shown that the lizards are subject to bacterial infections, but rarely parasites.

References

Polychrotidae
Lizards of South America
Reptiles of Argentina
Reptiles of Bolivia
Reptiles of Brazil
Reptiles of Paraguay
Reptiles described in 1825
Taxa named by Johann Baptist von Spix